John Sefa Ayim Ph.D is a Ghanaian academician and the former Vice Chancellor of the Kwame Nkrumah University of Science and Technology. He is the first Alumnus of Kwame Nkrumah University of Science and Technology to become a Vice Chancellor. He was the Dean of the Faculty of Pharmacy (1996 to 1999),  Head of the Department of Pharmaceutical Chemistry,  of the Kwame Nkrumah University of Science and Technology.

Term as Vice Chancellor
Prof. Ayim served as Vice Chancellor of KNUST from 1999 to 2002.

References

Living people
Vice-Chancellors of the Kwame Nkrumah University of Science and Technology
Vice-Chancellors of universities in Ghana
Year of birth missing (living people)
Academic staff of Kwame Nkrumah University of Science and Technology